Thymelicus sylvatica is an eastern Palearctic butterfly in the Hesperiidae (Hesperiinae). The species can be found in Amur, Ussuri, southwest China, Korea, and Japan.

The larva feeds on Calamagrostis, Bromus, Agropyron, Brachypodium, Carex.

Subspecies
T. s. sylvatica
T. s. astigmatus (Leech, 1894) (Chang Yang)
T. s. teneprosus (Leech, 1894)
T. s. occidentalis (Leech, 1894) (Ta Chien Lou)
T. s. nishimurai Hamada et Fujioka, 1997

References

Hesperiinae
Butterflies described in 1861
Butterflies of Asia
Taxa named by Otto Vasilievich Bremer